Lai-Sheng Wang (born 1961 in  Henan, China) is an experimental physical chemist currently serving as the Chair of the Chemistry Department at Brown University. Wang is known for his work on atomic gold pyramids and planar boron clusters.

Education
Wang obtained a B.S. degree in Chemistry from Wuhan University in 1982, and a Ph.D. in Chemistry from the University of California, Berkeley in 1990. He completed his postdoctoral stay at Rice University before moving to Richland, WA in 1993 to accept a joint position between Washington State University and Pacific Northwest National Laboratory. In 2009 he moved to Brown University, where he teaches physical chemistry and conducts research. He was named the Jesse H. and Louisa D. Sharpe Metcalf Professor of Chemistry in 2015 and Chair of the Department in 2019.

Research
Throughout his career, Wang has predominately studied nanoclusters and solution-phase chemistry in the gas phase, focusing on the fundamental behaviors of nanoclusters using photoelectron spectroscopy and computational techniques. With his group, Wang has discovered golden bucky-balls and the smallest golden pyramid, as well as aromatic clusters and planar boron clusters. In addition, his group has pioneered spectroscopic studies in the gas-phase of free multiply-charged anions and solution-phase molecules, such as metal complexes, redox species, and biologically-relevant molecules. His group has also developed ion-trap techniques to create ultracold anions that allow high resolution photoelectron spectroscopy to be performed on complex molecules.

Photoelectron spectroscopy revealed a relatively simple spectrum, suggesting a symmetric cluster. Neutral B36 is the smallest boron cluster to have sixfold symmetry and a perfect hexagonal vacancy, and it can be viewed as a potential basis for extended two-dimensional boron sheets.

Wang has published over 530 articles, which have been featured in publications such as Nature Magazine, Science, Physical Review Letters, Angewandte Chemie, and the Journal of the American Chemical Society.

Honors and awards
1996 CAREER Award, U.S. National Science Foundation
1997 Westinghouse Distinguished Professor in Materials Science and Engineering, Washington State University
1997 Alfred P. Sloan Research Fellow
2003 American Physical Society Fellow
2005 Distinguished Faculty Award, Washington State University
2005 Guggenheim Fellowship
2006 Humboldt Senior Research Award
2007 Sahlin Faculty Excellence Award for Research, Scholarship and Arts, Washington State University
2007 American Association for the Advancement of Science Fellow
2014 Earle K. Plyler Prize for Molecular Spectroscopy
2021 E. Bright Wilson Award in Spectroscopy
2023 Herbert P. Broida Prize

Affiliations
American Chemical Society
American Physical Society
Materials Research Society 
American Association for the Advancement of Science

References

1961 births
Living people
Chemists from Henan
Physicists from Henan
Computational chemists
UC Berkeley College of Chemistry alumni
Brown University faculty
Washington State University faculty
Wuhan University alumni
Fellows of the American Physical Society
Fellows of the American Association for the Advancement of Science
Educators from Henan
Chinese science writers
Writers from Henan